Srinish Aravind (born 2 June 1985) is an Indian television actor and model, who works in Tamil and Malayalam films and television series also few Telugu TV serials. He was one of the five finalists in the reality show Bigg Boss Malayalam season 1 .

Early life
Srinish Aravind was born and brought up in Chennai, where his father was employed, but his family comes from the Palakkad district of Kerala. His parents are Aravind Nair and Lakshmi Kumari. He has two elder sisters, and attended J. R. K. Matriculation Higher Secondary School, Chennai, later graduating as a Bachelor of Commerce from Guru Nanak College; he also attended Balu Mahendra Institute of Film Technology, Chennai. Before entering the entertainment industry, he used to work at Kindle Systems as a recruiter and at Vasan Healthcare as an Operations Executive. Aravind had several other jobs, as well as modelling, and appeared in a couple of short films in Tamil before entering the television industry.

Career
Srinish attained public recognition after acting in the mega serial Pranayam on Asianet, in the role of Sharan G. Menon. It was directed by Sudheesh Shankar and produced by Merryland Murugan. It was a remake of the Hindi serial Ye Hai Mohabbatein telecast on Star TV, based on the novel Custody by Manju Kapur. In Pranayam, his character Saran G Menon was the male lead, the CEO of a multinational company. In 2017, he made his Tamil television debut with the long-running serial Vamsam (TV series) playing a negative role called Raj alongside actress Ramya Krishnan. On 28 April Pranayam ended completing 524 episodes, from the next week he signed into play the lead role in another Malayalam serial Ammuvinte Amma. He did a short stint in a Telugu serial Natachirami in Gemini TV and in Niram Maaratha Pookkal (TV series) in Zee Tamil before entering into Bigg Boss (Malayalam season 1).

In 2018, he contested in the first season of the reality TV show Bigg Boss on Asianet and emerged as the third runner-up of the show completing 100 days. After Bigg boss he joined in Zee Keralam channel as the lead hero of Sathya Enna Penkutty serial as Sudhip. He also did two webseries ( Pearlish & Avastha) with his wife Pearle Maaney which was aired in her YouTube channel. He also did a Telugu serial called Srimanthudu for a short period in ETV (Telugu) channel. He is joining Sun TV Network Poove Unakkaga (TV series) as the lead role.

Personal life
During the season one of Malayalam Bigg Boss reality show in 2018, Srinish developed a romantic relationship with co-contestant Pearle Maaney and both of them expressed their wish to get married. On 17 January 2019, Srinish got engaged to Pearle at a private ceremony. They got married twice. The first one was on 5 May 2019 at a church in Aluva by Christian rituals and the next by Hindu rituals on 8 May 2019 in Palakkad. On March 20, 2021 they had a baby girl named Nila Srinish.

Filmography

Films
 All films are in Tamil, Otherwise noted.

Television

References

External links
 
 
 

1985 births
Indian male film actors
Living people
Indian male television actors
Indian male soap opera actors
21st-century Indian male actors
Malayali people
Bigg Boss Malayalam contestants